BDA Dushanbe is a football club based in Dushanbe, Tajikistan. Formed in 1996 as Varzob Dushanbe, the club changed to their current name in 2001.

History

Domestic history

Continental history

1 FC Dustlik did not show up for the 1st leg in Dushanbe due to the Tajikistani civil war; they were ejected from the competition and fined $10,000.

Managers
 Sharif Nazarov (1999?–01?)

Honours
Tajik League (3): 1998, 1999, 2000
Tajik Cup (2): 1998, 1999

References

Football clubs in Tajikistan
Football clubs in Dushanbe